The Port of Merca, also known as Merca Port, is the official seaport of Merca, situated in southeastern Somalia. It is classified as a jetty class port. It has a harbour as well as a pier which juts into the Somali Sea.

History

Originally -and for many centuries- there were only fishing activities in the beach of the small coastal village now called Merca.

Porto di Merca
The port was a small fishing inlet in the early 1900s, but in the 1920s the Italian governor De Vecchi created a "real' port installation, called officially in Italian Porto di Merca, with a dock for ships for Italian Somalia exports of bananas.

In the late 1920s and mainly in the 1930s there was a colony of Italian settlers in the port-city of Merca, that was greatly improved. The Port of Merca was the second in Italian Somalia and was nicknamed "port of bananas" (porto bananiero) because from there was exported in those years the huge production of Somali bananas toward Italy and Europe.

In the city of Merca there was a huge economical development in the 1930s, due mainly to the growing commerce of the port of Merca connected by small railway to the farm area of Genale and Villabruzzi. During WWII some damages were done by the British to Merca and the port.

 

The banana commerce continued in the first years after the war, mainly during the decade (1950-1960) of Italian Trusteeship of Somalia.

Merca port after WW2

The port had a minor activity in the 1950s, 1960s and 1970s. The Port of Merca was destroyed during the civil war in the 1990s, with all the remaining facilities for exporting bananas.

The port of Merca (and the city) was abandoned by government forces and captured by Al-Shabaab in February 2016. It was recaptured by the Somali National Army along with African Union troops, a few days later. A small battle was fought in which a Somali soldier, several militants, and four civilians died.

See also
Transportation in Somalia
Port of Mogadishu

References

Bibliography
 Antonicelli, Franco. Trent'anni di storia italiana 1915 - 1945. Ed. Mondadori. Torino, 1961.

Merca
Lower Shabelle